Lake Shore Drive (officially Jean Baptiste Pointe du Sable Lake Shore Drive, and called DuSable Lake Shore Drive, The Outer Drive, The Drive, or LSD) is a multilevel expressway that runs alongside the shoreline of Lake Michigan, and adjacent to parkland and beaches, in Chicago. Except for the portion north of Foster Avenue (5200 North), Lake Shore Drive is designated as part of U.S. Highway 41.

Previously, from the Chicago River south to 57th Street, it was named Leif Ericson Drive in 1927, for Norse explorer Leif Ericson. The roadway was also nicknamed Field Boulevard. The entire road was renamed Lake Shore Drive in 1946, and its scenic views of the waterfront, beaches, parks, towers and high-rises have become symbolic of Chicago.

On June 25, 2021, the Chicago City Council approved a compromise ordinance renaming the outer portion of Lake Shore Drive for the city's first non-indigenous settler, Jean Baptiste Pointe du Sable.


History

Early history

Lake Shore Drive's origins date back to Potter Palmer, who coerced the city to build the street adjacent to his lakefront property to enhance its value. Palmer built his "castle" at 1350 N. Lake Shore Drive in 1882.  The drive was originally intended for leisurely strolls for the wealthy in their carriages, but as the auto age dawned it took on a different role completely.

In 1937, the double-decker Link Bridge (officially the Outer Drive Bridge) over the Chicago River opened, along with viaducts over rail yards and other industrial areas connecting to both ends of it. The lower level was intended for a railroad connection, but it was never used until LSD was rebuilt in 1986. At the time the bridge was built, it was the longest and widest bascule bridge in the world.  The Lake Shore Drive (Outer Drive) and Link Bridge Photograph Album, c1937, documents the bridge's construction.  The album is held by the Ryerson & Burnham Libraries at the Art Institute of Chicago.

North of the river, LSD intersected Ohio Street at grade, and then passed over Grand Avenue and Illinois Street on its way to the bridge South of the river. LSD came from the south on its current alignment, but continued straight at the curve north of Monroe Street, rising onto a viaduct. It intersected Randolph Street at grade and then continued north above the Illinois Central Railroad's yard. At the river, it made a sharp turn to the right, and another sharp turn to the left onto the bridge. This reverse curve (actually a pair of 90-degree turns) was known locally as the "S-Curve" or the "S-Turn" and was a bottleneck to drivers for many years until the 1980s reconstruction.

Lake Shore Drive was extended from Belmont Avenue (3200n) north to Foster Avenue (5200n) in 1933, where it terminated until the 1950s when it was extended — first briefly to Bryn Mawr (5600n) and then in 1957 to its present terminus at Hollywood Avenue (5700n).  The landfill used for the 1930s extension was mostly dirt, but the 1950s extension included rubble and debris from the destruction of homes razed for the construction of the Congress Expressway (now the Eisenhower Expressway).  Portions of the drive between Irving Park Road and Foster Avenue still contain the original concrete from the 1930s but have been paved over in 2009.

Prior to the extension to Hollywood, traffic was funneled onto Foster, then north onto Sheridan Road, which still remains a wide 4-lane street to this day, though most traffic doesn't rejoin Sheridan until LSD ends at Hollywood Avenue now.  Sheridan Road south of Foster narrows to 2 lanes of traffic with street parking on each side as well.

Proposed Interstate

In the 1950s and 1960s, Illinois and Cook County presented plans for an Interstate 494 to run along part of LSD. Initially, I-494 was planned to travel northward starting at the I-94 (now I-90) Skyway/Stony Island interchange. It then would have travel along Stony Island Avenue, then cutting through Jackson Park, then travel along part of Lake Shore Drive (sometimes freeway-standard), and then turning west along Ohio Street and its feeder ramp before ending at the Kennedy Expressway. Later, it was planned to connect south towards the currently-named Bishop Ford Freeway. The extension of a proposed freeway would have followed along Stony Island Avenue, as well as the present-day feeder ramp of it, connecting to modern-day Bishop Ford Freeway. An I-494 proposal was also considered around the same time for the Crosstown Expressway. In 1966, I-494 was relocated to the Crosstown Expressway, effectively canceling further upgrades to LSD as well as its designation as an Interstate.

Later history

When Wacker Drive was extended east to LSD in the 1970s, its upper level ended at LSD at the west curve (the lower level dead-ended underneath). A new development at the northeast corner of the Randolph Street intersection resulted in an extension of Randolph across LSD.

Construction began in 1982 on a realignment of LSD south of the river (along with a reconstruction north of the river). A whole new alignment was built, greatly smoothing the S-curve. The northbound side opened in October 1985, and the southbound side opened in November 1986. A new lower level was built, using the lower level of the bridge, and providing access to the new Wacker Drive and the roads on the north side of the river.

The old road south of Randolph became a Cancer Survivors Plaza; the east–west part was reconstructed as part of Wacker Drive (which was being rebuilt at the time). The rest, between Randolph and Wacker, was kept for several years as Field Boulevard but was demolished in 1994. Only some old street lighting, sidewalks & fire hydrants remain, marking the former route. Current plans are for new upper-level streets in the area as part of the Lakeshore East development.

On November 10, 1996, new northbound lanes opened next to the original southbound lanes at Soldier Field, eliminating the original wide median from 1943. Prior to this 1996 reconstruction, the northbound lane ran on the east side of Soldier Field while the southbound lane ran on the west side.

On March 20, 2003, some 15,000 anti-war protesters marched along Lake Shore Drive the day after the United States invasion of Iraq, stopping all traffic for several hours. The spontaneous direct action occurred after the original protest route through downtown Chicago, as planned by the Chicago Coalition Against War & Racism, was blocked by law enforcement.  Approximately 900 marchers were arrested and a City Council investigation was held before all charges were dropped.

During the Groundhog Day Blizzard, Lake Shore Drive had to be closed because of the large amount of snow present on the roadway.  The city estimated 900 vehicles became stuck on Lake Shore Drive, with the Associated Press reporting approximately 1,500 vehicles stuck.  Hundreds of motorists had become stranded on Lake Shore Drive, some for as long as 12 hours.  Crews worked around the clock to remove the vehicles and clear the roadway, and Lake Shore Drive was reopened just before dawn on February 3, 2011.

A thirty-year development plan estimated to cost $4 billion was approved by Chicago in September 2010, for the former site of the US Steel plant in South Chicago, which operated along the neighborhood's shoreline from 1880 to 1992, and which has undergone extensive demolition and environmental remediation since; included in the plan was an extension of Lake Shore Drive through the property. This extension opened at 9 am October 27, 2013.

Renaming in honor of du Sable
As early as 1993, a proposal to rename Lake Shore Drive in honor of du Sable was backed by former Alderpeople Toni Preckwinkle (4th Ward) and Madeline Haithcock (2nd Ward). However, this plan was rejected by former Mayor Richard M. Daley, citing high cost.

Then, in October 2019, a 1993 proposal was reintroduced by 4th Ward Alderman David Moore and co-sponsored by ten others. This time, the plan gained traction in response to the murder of George Floyd as well as the changing political landscape. In December 2020, a hearing was established but the vote was delayed to April 2021 as Mayor Lightfoot sought alternatives to honor du Sable. Also, the plan was amended to reduce the price tag, only renaming outer Lake Shore Drive from Hollywood Avenue to 67th Street. In late April 2021, the amended plan was approved by the City Council Committee. The vote was expected to take place in late May but was delayed again to late June due to the mayor's opposition. In late June, the proposal was passed by the City Council, voting 33-15 in favor of it. A majority of non-white residents were in favor of the renaming plan, as were a majority of non-white alderpeople voting on the name change. In contrast, a majority of white residents were opposed to the plan, and two-thirds of the alderpeople who voted against the renaming ordinance identified as non-Hispanic white.

Future development plans

By contrast to the 2010s southern extension, the extension of Lake Shore Drive to the north has been the subject of controversy in recent years. In 2004, a private foundation solicited plans, and the Chicago Park District considered a feasibility study, to extend Lake Shore Drive farther north through Rogers Park and into Evanston.  Residents protested against cutting neighborhoods off from the lake, and Rogers Park and Edgewater voters rejected the extension in a referendum placed on the ballot by citizen initiative in November 2004. However, in spring 2005, the Chicago Park District spent $350,000 on plans for new marinas along Lake Shore Drive, including one at Devon-Granville, and in July 2005, Cong. Jan Schakowsky (IL-9) obtained federal funding reported variously as $800,000 and $1 million for a study of the possible extension of the Chicago North lakefront path; both of these developments fueled residents' suspicion of a secret city plan to extend the Drive. The controversy remained an issue through the 2007 aldermanic election in the 49th Ward. In 2008, proposals by Friends of the Parks to extend the lakefront park system north, possibly through offshore manmade islands linked by bike paths, met with similar resident opposition. Despite statements by FOP that no extension of the Drive was contemplated, activists contended that the Park District "has plans already drawn up that clearly show Lake Shore Drive immediately east of" Edgewater and Rogers Park. Another proposal put forward in 2017 was to straighten out the Scurve near Oak Street Beach by putting part of the roadway underground and extending parkland into the lake.

A current proposal to improve Lake Shore Drive from Grand Avenue to Hollywood Avenue is underway.

Route

Junction list

The Drive connects the following Chicago community areas from South to North: South Shore; Woodlawn; Hyde Park; Kenwood; Oakland; Douglas; Near South Side; The Loop; Near North Side; Lincoln Park; Lake View; Uptown; and Edgewater.

Parallel roads

Lake Shore Drive contains both an inner and an outer drive.

The original inner drive (or local) is used for slower local traffic and is connected to the street grid.  The local drive runs from downtown in Streeterville to LaSalle Drive, (becoming Cannon Drive).  Then the inner drive reappears just south of Diversey Parkway (approx. 2800n), continuing north to Irving Park Road (4000n).  The portion from Belmont (3200n) to just south of Irving Park (4000n) was previously named Sheridan Road (which can still be seen carved in stone in at least one vintage high-rise).

The outer drive (or express) with limited-access runs from the south side of the city, north to the terminus at Hollywood Avenue (5700n) in the Edgewater neighborhood.  The outer drive limits the ability of pedestrians to access the lake directly from the street grid.

Lake Shore Drive runs both north-south and east-west. Other streets in Chicago that run both north-south and east-west include Wacker Drive, Sheridan Road, and Hyde Park Blvd.

The Lakefront Trail, an  multi-use trail, parallels Lake Shore Drive on the east side for most of its length.  Pedestrians can access the lake at several points along Lake Shore Drive through underpasses that connect the lake with the rest of the city.

Link Bridge

The Outer Drive Bridge, also known as the Link Bridge, is the official name of the bridge carrying the Lake Shore Drive portion of US 41 over the main branch of the Chicago River. It is designed as a bascule bridge, and is one of only two in the city to have an upper and lower deck, both dedicated to automobile traffic (the other being on Michigan Avenue).  Wells Street Bridge also has two levels, but the upper level is for elevated train traffic into the Loop.

The Link Bridge was constructed in 1937. At the time of its construction, it was considered to be both the widest and longest bascule bridge in the world.

Notable places

Locations

860-880 Lake Shore Drive Apartments
The Aquitania
Burnham Park
Chicago Yacht Club
Drake Hotel
DuSable Park
Edgewater Beach Apartments
Grant Park
Harbor Point Condominium
International Museum of Surgical Science
Jackson Park
63rd Street Beach
Kwanusila Totem Pole
Lake Point Tower
Lincoln Park
McCormick Place
Montrose Beach
Museum Campus Chicago
Adler Planetarium
Field Museum of Natural History
Shedd Aquarium
Museum of Science and Industry
Navy Pier
North Avenue Beach
Northerly Island
Oak Street Beach
One Museum Park
Playboy Enterprises
Promontory Point
Soldier Field
Temple Sholom

Neighborhoods
Bronzeville
Edgewater
Hyde Park
Kenwood
Lakeview
Lincoln Park
Gold Coast
Streeterville
South Shore
South Loop
Uptown
Woodlawn

Parks
Much of Chicago's shoreline is given over to public parks.  The Drive, running through or alongside these parks, gives travelers views and access to these parks and their many amenities.  In addition, the Chicago Lakefront Trail (abbreviated as LFT) is an 18-mile multi-use path that often runs in the parks near the Drive. It is popular with cyclists and joggers.  From north to south, the parks are Lincoln Park, Grant Park, Burnham Park and Jackson Park.

Use in culture

As political moniker
In the 20th century, the tiny neighborhoods near Lake Shore Drive came to be occupied by exclusive high-rise apartments, condominiums and co-op buildings. To the political columnist Mike Royko, Lake Shore Drive was goo-goo territory, a land occupied by Chicago's wealthy "good-government" types. Royko sometimes used Lake Shore Drive as a political moniker. Though he often agreed with the reformers, he looked upon them with the same cynical eye as his fictional Chicago everyman, Slats Grobnik.

In popular culture

Many films based in Chicago feature scenes on Lake Shore Drive, including Cheaper by the Dozen, Ferris Bueller's Day Off, The Blues Brothers, The Break-Up, Risky Business, Love Jones, My Best Friend's Wedding, Somewhere in Time and National Lampoon's Vacation. In When Harry Met Sally..., the title characters are seen taking Lake Shore Drive in the opposite compass direction to that which their origin point and destination would require.

In television, Lake Shore Drive is seen in AT&T's/"The New Cingular's" "Weight" ad with the ad's protagonist driving south along Lake Shore Drive towards the John Hancock Building. The opening credits of the late 1980s and early 1990s sitcom Married... with Children features a flyover of Lake Shore Drive. Also, the medical drama ER has shot scenes at or near Lake Shore Drive over the show's 15 season run.

The 1971 song "Lake Shore Drive" by Aliotta Haynes Jeremiah is a reference to the road. Styx mentions the road in their 1979 song "Borrowed Time" as well as "Back to Chicago" from 1990. The road is also mentioned in the 2005 Kanye West songs "Drive Slow" and "Grammy Family", as well as in his verse in the Boost Mobile promotional single "Whole City Behind Us." The song "Lake Shore Drive" by Art Porter Jr. is also about the famous road. It is also mentioned in Fall Out Boy's song, "Lake Effect Kid": "joke us, joke us 'till Lake Shore Drive comes back into focus."

Lake Shore Drive is also featured in the 1999 Microsoft game Midtown Madness.

In the Electronic Arts NASCAR video game series, 2005: Chase for the Cup, 06: Total Team Control, 07, 08, and 09 all include a fictional street course that uses part of the real-life Lake Shore Drive, along with a few side streets. In Chase for the Cup, it is referred to as Lakeshore Drive, and must be unlocked by using a cheat code. In the latter four games, it goes by Wal-Mart Raceway, and is available from the start.

See also

 Bike The Drive
 Boulevard Lakefront Tour

Footnotes

References

External links

 Time magazine article
 Lake Shore Drive Redux from ForgottenChicago.com
 Historic, current, and average travel times for Lake Shore Drive

Expressways in the Chicago area
Streets in Chicago
Roads in Illinois
Coastal construction
U.S. Route 41